The National League Four-Team Championship was a contest between teams competing in the second tier of speedway in the United Kingdom. Teams were grouped into fours, with one rider from each team in each race. The winners and second place of each group compete for the Championship in the final. It was known as the National League Four-Team Championship from 1976 until 1990, and as the British League Division Two Four-Team Championship from 1991 until 1994, reflecting the different names used for the league.

In 1995, a new competition called the Premier League Four-Team Championship replaced this league. However because division 1 and 2 merged for the 1995 and 1996 seasons, the event was run as the only Fours championship. From 1997 it reverted back to an event for tier two teams only.

Winners

See also
 List of United Kingdom Speedway Fours Champions
 Speedway in the United Kingdom

References

Speedway competitions in the United Kingdom